Cameron Mackenzie (born 21 January 2004) is an Australian rules footballer who plays in the Australian Football League (AFL). He was the seventh selection in the 2022 AFL draft by Hawthorn Football Club. He has been described as a reliable and well-rounded player with a measured temperament.

References 

Living people
2004 births
Hawthorn Football Club players
Sandringham Dragons players
Box Hill Football Club players
Australian rules footballers from Victoria (Australia)